Colombo Dockyard PLC (CDPLC) is a ship building company in Sri Lanka and is based in Colombo. It has built both military and civilian vessels for both local and overseas clients.

History
Colombo Dockyard established its operations in 1974 and is one of Sri Lanka's engineering facilities in the business of ship repair, shipbuilding, heavy engineering and offshore engineering. It is situated within the Port of Colombo, thus having the benefits of a deep water harbour.

Facilities and operation

It is accredited with the ISO 9001-2015 quality certification by Lloyd's Register Quality Assurance.

Colombo Dockyard has operated in joint collaboration with Onomichi Dockyard Japan since 1993- the collaboration's twenty-year anniversary was celebrated on March 26, 2013.

In 2020 Colombo Dockyard build Eco bulk carriers for Norwegian Misje Eco Bulk company, Misje subsidiary of Kåre Misje & Co. Colombo Dockyard build Buoy Tender Vessel sell to ports of Iraq through Toyota Tsusho Corporation of Japan. Japan International Cooperation Agency (JICA) help this project.

Known ship classes built
The following were known to be made by CD:

 Jayasagara class patrol craft
 Fisheries Protection Vessel
 Colombo class
 Coastal surveillance vessel
 Fire fighting vessel
 29 M Landing Craft
 Fast Landing Craft
 35&40 Meter Fisheries Protection Vessel
 65 Ton Bollard Pull Tug
 Anchor Handling Tug Supply Vessel (80 Ton Bollard Pull)
 Passenger Vessels (250 Passengers)
 Passenger Vessels (400 Passengers)
 Multipurpose Platform Supply Vessel
 Fast Patrol Vessel
 Anchor Handling Tug Supply Vessel (130 Ton Bollard Pull)
VARD 9-01 111.3m Undersea Cable Laying Vessel
VARD 7 85m OPV

Customers

Military clients

Sri Lanka Coast Guard
Maldivian Coast Guard

International clients
Bourbon 
Columbia Shipmanagement (Singapore) 
Dredging Corporation of India 
Dredging International 
Eurobulk 
GOL Offshore 
The Greatship Group 
Hyundai Engineering & Construction 
Kotoku Kaiun 
Maersk 
Mercator 
Safety Management Overseas 
Shipping Corporation of India 
Pakistan National Shipping Corporation 
Sinochem Shipping 
Tanker Pacific 
Thome 
Tide Water 
Titan Fleet Management 
Van Oord

References

External links

Companies listed on the Colombo Stock Exchange
Manufacturing companies based in Colombo
Vehicle manufacturing companies established in 1974
Sri Lankan companies established in 1974